Mt. Tabor Methodist Episcopal Church, also known as Mt. Tabor United Methodist Church, is an historic church located at 1421 St. Stephens Church Road, in Crownsville, Anne Arundel County, Maryland.  The wood-frame building was constructed in 1893.  It is rectangular in plan and features a bell tower projecting from the gable front. The bell tower was added between 1923 and 1929 by Henry and John Queen. Also on the property is the Mt. Tabor Good Samaritan Lodge No. 59.

It was listed on the National Register of Historic Places in 2001.

References

External links
, including photo from 2000, at Maryland Historical Trust
"Our Legacy: Mt. Tabor church celebrating 150 years" article

Churches on the National Register of Historic Places in Maryland
United Methodist churches in Maryland
Churches in Anne Arundel County, Maryland
Churches completed in 1893
19th-century Methodist church buildings in the United States
African-American history of Maryland
National Register of Historic Places in Anne Arundel County, Maryland
Tourist attractions in Anne Arundel County, Maryland